Arnold Moll (5 May 1675 – 10 February 1729) was the Dutch commander of Jaffanapatnam from 1723 to 1725 and acting Governor of Ceylon from 21 June 1723 to 12 January 1724. He previously had been merchant on Ambon and since 1707 Commander of Galle. He was also a member of the Council of the Dutch East Indies. He married the baroness Christina van Reede (1690–1731) with whom he had three daughters.

References
De Wapenheraut, 187, p. 159

1675 births
1729 deaths
18th-century Dutch people
Dutch expatriates in Sri Lanka
Governors of Dutch Ceylon
People from Batavia, Dutch East Indies